NHL Slapshot is EA Sports' first ice hockey video game on the Wii, released in 2010. It was the first game in the NHL series since NHL 2005 to receive an E rating, mainly because the game does not include fighting.

Game cover
Wayne Gretzky is the game's cover athlete. This marked the first time that the EA Sports NHL series featured a retired ice hockey player on the cover as well as Wayne Gretzky's first appearance on a cover of a video game since Gretzky NHL 2006.

Hockey stick peripheral

A miniature hockey stick peripheral was released with the game, allowing (but not requiring) the player to insert the Wii Remote and its Nunchuk attachment and simulate playing with a real hockey stick.

Reception

The game received "generally favorable reviews" according to the review aggregation website Metacritic.

See also
 NHL 11, another ice hockey video game by EA Sports, released for the PlayStation 3 and Xbox 360
 NHL 2K11, another ice hockey video game, by 2K Sports for the Wii and iOS

References

External links
 

2010 video games
Electronic Arts games
EA Sports games
NHL (video game series)
Nintendo Wi-Fi Connection games
Wii Wi-Fi games
Wii-only games
Multiplayer and single-player video games
Video games set in the United States
Video games set in Canada
Video games developed in Canada
Wayne Gretzky games